was a town located in Miyako District, Fukuoka Prefecture, Japan.

As of 2003, the town had an estimated population of 7,268 and a density of 74.16 persons per km². The total area was 98.00 km².

On March 20, 2006, Saigawa, along with the towns of Katsuyama and Toyotsu (all from Miyako District), was merged to create the town of Miyako.

External links
Miyako official website 

Dissolved municipalities of Fukuoka Prefecture
Populated places disestablished in 2006
2006 disestablishments in Japan